The 2017/18 FIS Freestyle Ski World Cup was the thirty ninth World Cup season in freestyle skiing organised by International Ski Federation. The season started on 27 August 2017 ended on 24 March 2018. This season included six disciplines: moguls, aerials, ski cross, halfpipe, slopestyle and big air.

Men

Ski Cross

Moguls

Slopestyle

Halfpipe

Aerials

Big Air

Ladies

Ski Cross

Moguls

Slopestyle

Halfpipe

Aerials

Big Air

Team

Men's standings

Overall

Ski Cross

Moguls

Slopestyle

Halfpipe

Aerials

Big Air

Cross Alps Tour

Ladies' standings

Overall

Ski Cross

Moguls

Slopestyle

Halfpipe

Aerials

Big Air

Cross Alps Tour

Nations Cup

Overall

Men's overall

Ladies' overall

Ski Cross

Moguls

Slopestyle

Halfpipe

Aerials

Big Air

Cross Alps Tour Overall

Men's Cross Alps Tour

Ladies' Cross Alps Tour

References 

FIS Freestyle Skiing World Cup
World Cup
World Cup